The  is a type of 4-6-2 steam locomotive built by the American Locomotive Company for the Japanese Government Railways in 1925. The locomotives were originally classified as the 8200 class under the JGR locomotive classification system.

They were acquired to sample the latest American three-cylinder conjugated valve gear steam technology; as a consequence only six – the minimum order – were purchased and the tenders were built locally by Hitachi. They were the last Japanese steam locomotives to be imported. These served as an exemplary forerunner to the C53.

See also
 Japan Railways locomotive numbering and classification
JGR Class 8900
JNR Class C51
JNR Class C53

References

1067 mm gauge locomotives of Japan
Steam locomotives of Japan
4-6-2 locomotives
ALCO locomotives
Railway locomotives introduced in 1928
Passenger locomotives